Blackstone Heights is a rural/residential locality in the local government areas (LGA) of Meander Valley (97.5%) and West Tamar (2.5%) in the Launceston LGA region of Tasmania. The 2016 census recorded a population of 1270 for the state suburb of Blackstone Heights. It is an outer suburb of Launceston.

Description
The loop is connected by Pitcher Parade which originates from near the Country Club Casino and is the only entrance to Blackstone Heights.

Services 
Blackstone Heights has a supermarket and cafe/restaurant. There are no schools in the suburb, with the closest schools located in the nearby suburb of Prospect. The suburb is serviced by a local bus service to and from Launceston. There is a Christian church located on Neptune Drive.

History 
Blackstone Heights is a confirmed locality.

Geography
Th South Esk River forms the western, northern and eastern boundaries.

Road infrastructure 
National Route 1 (Bass Highway) passes to the south-east. From there, a series of roads provide access to the locality.

References

Localities of Meander Valley Council
Suburbs of Launceston, Tasmania
Localities of West Tamar Council